Millwoods Christian School, located in southeast Edmonton, Alberta, Canada, is an alternative school in the Edmonton Public School System.

With its campus situated in the neighbourhood of Tweddle Place in Mill Woods, it has been serving the community since 1978. The school opened as an independent school under the direction of Calvary Community Church, a non-denominational church in south Edmonton. Over the years the school population steadily increased as more and more parents began to choose Christian education for their children. In 2000, the school entered into an agreement with the Edmonton Public School Board, and now operates as an alternative program with EPSB. Millwoods Christian School has a strong theatre program and a well recognized learning environment. Every year, many high school students volunteer and raise money to travel to countries in need and serve for weeks at a time with the Millwoods Christian School service trip program.

Service Trip Program 

MCS has been actively involved in serving others in their community and around the world by giving students the opportunity to enrol in a service trip program. This includes travelling to places like Belize, Mexico, the Dominican Republic, etc. Fundraising is a big part of joining a service trip. This is done with events such as a silent auction, doing bottle drives and the Taste of MCS; which gives the students a chance to sample different cultures of food. If students do not choose to join one of these trips, they join what is called Team Canada, helping and serving the community within Edmonton.

References

External links
 Millwoods Christian School Web Page
 Calvary Community Church Web Page

High schools in Edmonton
Educational institutions established in 1978
Nondenominational Christian schools in Canada
1978 establishments in Alberta